The Robert Award for Best Short Television Series is one of the merit awards presented by the Danish Film Academy at the annual Robert Awards ceremony. The award has been handed out since 2014.

Honorees

2010s 
 2015: Tidsrejsen – Kaspar Munk
 2016: Ditte & Louise – Ditte Hansen, Louise Mieritz, and Niclas Bendixen
 2017: Ditte & Louise II – Ditte Hansen, Louise Mieritz, and Niclas Bendixen
 2018:  – Flemming Klem and 
 2019:  –

References

External links 
  

2014 establishments in Denmark
Awards established in 2014
Television Series, Short
Television awards